The Älvsborg Regiment, designation I 15 and I 15/Fo 34, was a Swedish Army infantry  regiment that traces its origins back 1624. It was disbanded in 1998. The regiment's soldiers were originally recruited from the provinces of Västergötland, and it was later garrisoned there in the town Borås.

Heraldry and traditions

Colours, standards and guidons
The regiment has carried a number of colours over the years. On 24 June 1854, the then crown prince, later King Charles XV presented the last battalion colours to the regiment. They were so called Oscar I type, and were presented at a summit on Axevalla heath. In 1904 the regiment adopted the 1st battalion's colour as regimental colour (which has been hanging in Älvsborgsmässen ("Älvsborg Mess") at Gothenburg Garrison since 1998).

Its last colour was presented to the former Älvsborg Regiment (I 15/Fo 34) at the Artillery Yard in Stockholm by the Supreme Commander, general Owe Wiktorin in 1996. It was used as regimental colour by I 15/Fo 34 until 1 July 1998. The colour was drawn by Ingrid Lamby and embroidered by machine in insertion technique by Maj Britt Salander/company Blå Kusten. Blazon: "The cloth divided six times in yellow and black, in the centre a circular shield with the badge of the regiment; azure, three wavy white bends sinister, charged with a yellow lion rampant with a royal crown proper, armed and langued gules, in the right forepaw a yellow sword and in the left a blue shield with three yellow crowns placed two and one. On the uppermost yellow length, battle honours (Lützen 1632, Leipzig 1642, Helsingborg 1710, Gadebusch 1712, Nya Älvsborg 1719) in black".

After the regiment was disbanded, the colour was passed on to the Älvsborg Group (Älvsborgsgruppen). Since 1 July 2005, the colour is carried by Elfsborg Group (Elfsborgsgruppen). The Elfsborg Group is also the unit that keeps the regimental traditions. The pattern of the colour has basically been unchanged since the 1600s.

Coat of arms
The coat of the arms of the Älvsborg Regiment (I 15/Fo 34) 1977–1994 and the Älvsborg Brigade (Älvsborgsbrigaden, IB 15) 1994–1997. Blazon: "The regimental badge, with waves six times divided bendy-sinister azure and argent, a double-tailed crowned lion rampant or, armed and langued gules, in dexter forepaw a sword or and in sinister a shield azure charged with three open crowns or placed two and one. The shield surmounted two muskets in saltire, or". The coat of arms of the Älvsborg Regiment (I 15/Fo 34) 1994–1997 and the Älvsborg Group (Älvsborgsgruppen) 1997–2004. Blazon: "Azur, the regimental badge, three waves bendy-sinister argent, a double-tailed crowned lion rampant or, armed and langued gules, in dexter forepaw a sword or and in sinister a shield azure charged with three open crowns or, placed two and one. The shield sur-mounted two swords in saltire, or."

Medals
In 1999, when the regiment was disbanded, the Älvsborgs regementes (I 15) minnesmedalj ("Älvsborg Regiment (I 15) Commemorative Medal") in silver (ÄlvsbregMM) was established. It consist of a Maltese cross in blue enamel. The medal ribbon is of red moiré with two blue stripes on the middle.

Commanding officers
Regimental commanders active at the regiment the years 1624–1998.

Commanders

1624–16??: N Ribbing
1698–1710: A Sparrfelt
1710–1728: J von Mentzer
1728–1739: J A Lillie
1739–1747: Carl Otto Lagercrantz
1747–1751: J L von Saltza
1751–1763: R J von Lingen
1763–1766: Fredrik Ribbing
1766–1769: Johan Cronhielm
1769–1781: B P von Wufrath
1781–1800: H W Hamilton
1800–1805: E Edenhielm
1805–1810: Eberhard von Vegesack
1810–1817: C Reuterskiöld
1817–1869: J von Utfall
1869–1886: P H Melin
1886–1892: A A Thorén
1892–1894: Christer Gustaf Oxehufvud
1894–1898: L J P Liljencrantz
1898–1903: Carl Axel Leonard Nordenadler
1903–1906: Oscar Silverstolpe
1906–1913: Gustaf Henrik Sjöqvist
1913–1916: Adolf Erik Ludvig Lagercrantz
1916–1920: Ernst Lars Isaac Silfverswärd
1920–1927: Karl Alfred Rignell
1927–1936: Axel Gustaf von Arbin
1936–1938: Arvid Moberg
1938–1942: Anders Teodor Bergquist
1942–1951: Gunnar Fredrik Brinck
1951–1956: Colonel Gustav Åkerman
1956–1959: Colonel Erik Rosengren
1959–1962: Bengt Uller
1962–1966: Sigmund Ahnfelt
1966–1975: Karl Gunnar Lundquist
1975–1981: Senior colonel Åke Ingmar Lundberg
1981–1986: Sven Henry Magnusson
1986–1989: Per Blomqvist
1989–1992: Svante Bergh
1992–1998: Matts Uno Liljegren
1998–1998: Nils Erling Krister Edvardsson

Deputy commanders
1979–1981: Colonel Ingmar Arnhall

Names, designations and locations

See also
List of Swedish infantry regiments

Footnotes

References

Notes

Print

Further reading

Infantry regiments of the Swedish Army
Disbanded units and formations of Sweden
Military units and formations established in 1714
Military units and formations established in 1998